These are the results of the Women's 1500 metres event at the 1997 World Championships in Athletics in Athens, Greece. The event was held on 2, 3 and 5 August.

Medalists

Results

Heats
First 6 of each Heat (Q) and the next 6 fastest (q) qualified for the semifinals.

Semifinals
First 5 of each Heat (Q) and the next 2 fastest (q) qualified for the final.

Final

References
 Results
 IAAF

- Women's 1500 Metres
1500 metres at the World Athletics Championships
1997 in women's athletics

ru:Чемпионат мира по лёгкой атлетике 1995 — бег на 1500 метров (женщины)